Sagar Shiv Mandir is a Hindu temple sitting on the island of Goyave de Chine, Poste de Flacq, Mauritius. Sagar Shiv Mandir is on the eastern part of Mauritius. It is a place of worship for Hindus settled in Mauritius and it is also visited by tourists. The temple was constructed in 2007 by Vikash Gunowa who donated millions of Pounds in its development.  
It is one of the Top 3 Hindu temples to see on the island.  It is surrounded by the lagoon and the mangroves that give to the place a mystical aspect.  It hosts a 108 feet height bronze coloured statue of Shiva.

The temple is similar to the Temple in the Sea in Trinidad and Tobago.

References

External links
 Sagar Shiv Mandir

21st-century Hindu temples
Hindu temples in Mauritius